This is a list of the most populous incorporated places of the United States. As defined by the United States Census Bureau, an incorporated place includes cities, towns, villages, boroughs, and municipalities. A few exceptional census-designated places (CDPs) are also included in the Census Bureau's listing of incorporated places. Consolidated city-counties represent a distinct type of government that includes the entire population of a county, or county equivalent. Some consolidated city-counties, however, include multiple incorporated places. This list presents only that portion (or "balance") of such consolidated city-counties that are not a part of another incorporated place.

This list refers only to the population of individual municipalities within their defined limits; the populations of other municipalities considered suburbs of a central city are listed separately, and unincorporated areas within urban agglomerations are not included. Therefore, a different ranking is evident when considering U.S. metropolitan areas.

50 states and Washington, D.C.

This table lists the 331 incorporated places in the United States (excluding the U.S. territories) with a population of at least 100,000 as of July 1, 2021 as estimated by the U.S. Census Bureau. Five states — Delaware, Maine, Vermont, West Virginia, and Wyoming — have no cities with populations exceeding 100,000.

The table displays:

 The city rank by population as of July 1, 2021, as estimated by the United States Census Bureau
 The city name
 The name of the state in which the city lies
 The city population as of July 1, 2021, as estimated by the United States Census Bureau
 The city population as of April 1, 2020, as enumerated by the 2020 United States census
 The city percent population change from April 1, 2020, to July 1, 2021
 The city land area as of January 1, 2020
 The city population density as of April 1, 2020 (residents per unit of land area)
 The city latitude and longitude coordinates

Distribution

Gallery

Puerto Rico

The following table lists the five municipalities of Puerto Rico with a population greater than 100,000 on July 1, 2021, as estimated by the United States Census Bureau.

If Puerto Rico were included with the broader U.S. list, San Juan would be the 57th largest city in the country. 

The table below contains the following information:

 The municipio rank by population as of July 1, 2021, as estimated by the United States Census Bureau
 The municipio
 The municipio population as of July 1, 2021, as estimated by the United States Census Bureau
 The municipio population as of April 1, 2020, as enumerated by the 2020 United States census
 The municipio percent population change from April 1, 2020, to July 1, 2021
 The municipio land area as of January 1, 2020
 The municipio population density as of April 1, 2020 (residents per land area)
 The municipio latitude and longitude coordinates

Other U.S. territories

As of 2021, four U.S. territories (American Samoa, Guam, the Northern Mariana Islands, and the U.S. Virgin Islands) do not have any cities with at least 100,000 people; because of this, no cities for these territories are listed.

Census-designated places

The following table lists U.S. census-designated places (CDPs) with populations of at least 100,000 according to the 2020 census.  A CDP is a concentration of population identified by the United States Census Bureau for statistical purposes. CDPs are delineated for each decennial census as the statistical counterparts of incorporated places such as cities, towns and villages. CDPs are populated areas that lack separate municipal government, but which otherwise physically resemble incorporated places.  Unlike the incorporated cities in the main list, the US Census Bureau does not release annual population estimates for CDPs.

The table below contains the following information:
 The census-designated place
 The state
 The census-designated place population as of April 1, 2020, as enumerated by the 2020 United States census
 The census-designated place population as of April 1, 2010, as enumerated by the 2010 United States census
 The census-designated place percent population change from April 1, 2010, to April 1, 2020
 The census-designated place land area as of January 1, 2020
 The census-designated place population density as of April 1, 2020 (residents per land area)
 The census-designated place latitude and longitude coordinates

Cities formerly over 100,000 people

The following table lists U.S. cities that, in past censuses, have had populations of at least 100,000 but have since decreased beneath this threshold or have been consolidated with or annexed into a neighboring city.

The table below contains the following information:
 Name of city
 Name of state
 The city population as of July 1, 2021, as estimated by the United States Census Bureau
 The city population as of April 1, 2020, as enumerated by the 2020 United States census
 The city's peak population based on highest official enumeration recorded by the census (and the year of that particular census)
 The percent decline in population from its peak census count to the most recent census enumeration in 2020.
 Additional notes.

Locations of 50 most populous cities

See also

 Demographics of the United States
 Largest cities in the United States by population by decade
List of largest cities – (world)
 List of largest cities of U.S. states and territories by population
 List of largest cities of U.S. states and territories by historical population
 List of United States cities by area
 List of United States cities by elevation
 List of United States cities by population density
 Lists of populated places in the United States
United States Census Bureau
 List of U.S. states and territories by population
 List of United States counties and county equivalents
Office of Management and Budget
 Statistical area (United States)
 Combined statistical area
 Core-based statistical area
List of core-based statistical areas
 Metropolitan statistical area
List of metropolitan statistical areas
 Micropolitan statistical area
List of micropolitan statistical areas

Notes

References

External links

 United States Government
 United States Census Bureau
 2010 United States Census
 USCB population estimates
 United States Office of Management and Budget

 01
Cities By Population
.Population